{{Infobox academic
| name               = Alan Berger
| honorific_prefix   = 
| image              = 
| image_size         = 
| alt                = 
| caption            = 
| birth_name         = 
| birth_date         = 
| birth_place        = 
| death_date         = 
| death_place        = 
| death_cause        = 
| other_names        = A.L Berger, A.L.B
| occupation         = Religion scholar, writer, literary scholar, lecturing, academics
| period             = 1978
| known_for          = Judaic education and Holocaust studies program at the Florida Atlantic University
| title              = Raddock Family eminent scholar chaired at Florida Atlantic University
| boards             =  Florida Atlantic University
| spouse             = 
| children           = 
| awards             = The 2002 B’nai Zion National Media Award, for edition of The second generation voices.
| website            = 
| education          = Syracuse UniversityUpsala CollegeUniversity of Chicago Divinity SchoolHebrew University
| alma_mater         = 
| thesis_title       = 
| thesis_url         = 
| thesis_year        = 
| school_tradition   = 
| doctoral_advisor   = 
| academic_advisors  =
| influences         = 
| era                = 
| discipline         = Religious studies
| sub_discipline     = 
| workplaces         = Florida Atlantic University, Syracuse University
| doctoral_students  = 
| notable_students   = 
| main_interests     = Religious studies
| notable_works      = Edited
 The second generation voices: Reflections by Children of Holocaust Survivors and Perpetrators.
 Encyclopedia of Holocaust Literature. (Spring), 2020.
| notable_ideas      = 
| influenced         = 
| signature          = 
| signature_alt      = 
| signature_size     = 
| footnotes          = 
}}

Alan L. Berger (born November 16, 1939) is an American scholar, writer and professor of Judaic Studies and Holocaust studies from the Florida Atlantic University. He occupies the Raddock Family eminent scholar chaired of the Holocaust Studies at  Florida Atlantic University and director Center for the Study of Values and Violence. He is best known for Judaism educations, Abrahamic religions challenges and scholar of Holocaust studies.

He graduated from the Hebrew University in 1972. He holds a B.A. at Upsala College, New Jersey, M.A. at University of Chicago Divinity School and obtained his Ph.D. from the Syracuse University in humanities studies in 1978.

 Career 
He was Judaic Studies lecturer since 1995 from the Florida Atlantic University and was from 1973 to 1995 lecturer at Syracuse University in the department of Religious studies. In 1980 he established the Jewish Studies program in the University of New York, Syracuse and from 1988 to 1989, he was a visiting associate professor of Judaic Studies in the Williamsburg, College of William and Mary, he lectures short term courses in some institutions and mostly lectures the Holocaust studies abroad for over many years.

 Holocaust and Jewish Studies establishment 
Berger was the founder of Holocaust and Judaic Studies, a B.A programs in 1980 at Florida Atlantic University and also chaired the directory head from 1998 to 2005. It was when he was lecturer in the department of Religious studies at Syracuse University that he established the Jewish Studies Program and was acting interim head of Fine Arts department and Religion studies Department, he also became a visiting Gumenick professor of Judaica at the College of William and Mary having chairs conference of Annual scholars in the Holocaust and churches in 1989 to 1990 and had also being a guest head of Lessons and Legacies of the Holocaust Conference programs that of 1989, 1998 and the one of 2010 and 2014, Berger served as a series editor in the Syracuse University Press of Theology, Holocaust and other Religion from 1998 to 2004.

 Other contributions and essays 
Berger had contributed to as many article, books and essays. He did more than 50 encyclopedia works. His article appeared in place and varieties, such are the likes of Religion and American Culture Journal of Ecumenical Studies, Encyclopedia of Genocide, Modern Judaism, Encyclopedia of Jewish American History and Culture, Jewish Book Annual, Studies in American Jewish Literature, Modern Language Studies, Saul Bellow Journal, Australian Journal of Jewish Studies, Judaism, Jewish Book Annual, Sociological Analysis and Literature and Belief.

List of books edited and awards

 The second generation voices: Reflections by Children of Holocaust Survivors and Perpetrators. Author and Editors; A L. Berger and Naomi Berger. 2020. . (Edition won the 2002 B’nai Zion National Media Award)
 Encyclopedia of Holocaust Literature. (Spring), 2020. Co-editors; A L. Berger. (won the Booklist Best Reference Book of 2002 award and the Outstanding Reference Source 2003 – Reference and User Services Association of the ALA)
 The Continuing Agony: From the Carmelite Convent to the Crosses at Auschwitz (Spring), 2004, nominated for the American Catholic Historical. A(ssociation's John Gilmary Shea Prizes)
 Jewish American and Holocaust Literature: Representation in the Postmodern World, 2004 Jewish-Christian Dialogue: Drawing Honey from the Rock, Paragon House, Co-authors; A L. Berger, 2008
 Encyclopedia of Jewish American Literature, co-editors; A L. Berger, 2009
 Trialogue and Terror: Judaism, Christianity and Islam Respond to 9/11, Cascade Press, 2011
 Post-Holocaust Jewish-Christian Dialogue: After the Flood, Before the Rainbow. contributor and Editors; A L. Berger, 2015
 Third Generation Holocaust Representation: Trauma, History, and Memory''. Northwestern University Press, co-authors; A L. Berger, 2017.

Notes 

Living people
1939 births
University of Chicago alumni
Syracuse University alumni
Florida Atlantic University faculty
Judaic studies
Holocaust studies
American encyclopedists
Hebrew University of Jerusalem alumni
Florida State University faculty
American University faculty and staff
Historians of the Holocaust
Jewish American historians
American male non-fiction writers